The Tasmanian boobook (Ninox leucopsis), also known as the Tasmanian spotted owl, is a species of owl in the family Strigidae. It is native to Tasmania.

Formerly considered conspecific with the morepork (N. novaeseelandiae), multiple phylogenetic studies have affirmed its status as a distinct species, and it was reclassified as distinct by the International Ornithological Congress in 2022.

It is widespread in Tasmania and on King Island and other islands of Bass Strait. It has been recorded in southern Victoria, and once from New South Wales. It predominantly occurs in eucalypt forests.

References

Sources

 

Ninox
Birds described in 1838
Endemic birds of Tasmania
Taxa named by John Gould